Mies yli laidan is the first single from the Ruoska album, Amortem.  In Finnish, "Mies yli laidan" means Man overboard.

Track listings

 "Mies yli laidan"

References

External links
 "Mies yli laidan" lyrics

Ruoska songs
2006 singles
2006 songs
EMI Records singles